Dexter Keith Manley (born February 2, 1959) is a former American football defensive end for the Washington Redskins, Phoenix Cardinals, and Tampa Bay Buccaneers of the National Football League (NFL). He also played in the Canadian Football League  for the Ottawa Rough Riders. Manley played college football at Oklahoma State University and was drafted by the Redskins in the fifth round of the 1981 NFL Draft.

Professional career

National Football League
Manley was drafted in the fifth round (119th overall) of the 1981 NFL Draft by the Washington Redskins, where he played for nine seasons.  During his career with the Redskins, Manley won two Super Bowl titles and was a Pro Bowler in 1986 when he recorded a Redskins single-season record of 18.5 sacks.

In 1989, Manley failed his third drug test, with an opportunity to apply for reinstatement after one year. He then played for the Phoenix Cardinals and Tampa Bay Buccaneers. However, after he failed his fourth drug test, he retired on December 12, 1991. He had a series of arrests related to his drug problem and was ultimately convicted and served 2 years in prison.

Officially, Manley had 97.5 quarterback sacks in his career.  His total rises to 103.5 when the six sacks he had his rookie year of 1981, when sacks were not yet an official statistic, are included. After his career in the United States ended, he revealed that he was functionally illiterate, despite having studied at Oklahoma State University for four years.

Canadian Football League
Manley also played two seasons in the Canadian Football League with the Ottawa Rough Riders (1992 and 1993).

Personal life
He was nicknamed the "Secretary of Defense" during his time with the Redskins. Manley lives in suburban Washington with his family.

Manley underwent brain surgery in June 2006 to treat a colloid cyst. He first learned about the cyst in 1986 after he collapsed in a Georgetown department store. His prognosis is for a relatively full recovery, although doctors have said that memory loss is a common side effect of the operation. In May 2020, it was announced that Manley had tested positive for COVID-19.

In an article by Taylor Branch entitled "The Shame of College Sports", prior to the U.S. Senate Subcommittee on Education, Arts, and Humanities in 1989, Manley was famously quoted as saying that he had been functionally illiterate in college.

References

External links
 

1959 births
Living people
American football defensive ends
Canadian football defensive linemen
National Conference Pro Bowl players
Oklahoma State Cowboys football players
Ottawa Rough Riders players
Shreveport Pirates players
Phoenix Cardinals players
Tampa Bay Buccaneers players
Washington Redskins players
Players of American football from Houston
Players of Canadian football from Houston
African-American players of American football
African-American players of Canadian football
American sportspeople convicted of crimes
21st-century African-American people
20th-century African-American sportspeople